Pachycormus is the scientific name for two genera of organisms and may refer to:

Pachycormus (fish), an extinct genus of ray-finned fishes from the Jurassic
Pachycormus (plant), a genus of plants in the family Anacardiaceae